Natalbany is a census-designated place (CDP) in Tangipahoa Parish, Louisiana, United States. The population was 1,739 at the 2000 census. It is part of the Hammond Micropolitan Statistical Area.

Etymology
The community is named after the nearby Natalbany River. It is speculated that the name of the river is derived from the Choctaw words nita meaning bear and abani which means "to cook over a fire" in the Choctaw language.

Geography
Natalbany is located at  (30.547856, -90.483765).

Demographics

2020 census

As of the 2020 United States census, there were 2,510 people, 1,130 households, and 553 families residing in the CDP.

2000 census
At the 2000 census, there were 1,739 people, 714 households and 411 families residing in the CDP. The racial makeup of the CDP was 67.74% White, 29.67% African American, 0.52% Native American, 0.23% Asian, 1.15% from other races, and 0.69% from two or more races. Hispanic or Latino of any race were 2.24% of the population.

There were 714 households, of which 31.8% had children under the age of 18 living with them, 38.0% were married couples living together, 16.7% had a female householder with no husband present, and 42.4% were non-families. 27.7% of all households were made up of individuals, and 6.6% had someone living alone who was 65 years of age or older. The average household size was 2.44 and the average family size was 3.06.

Age distribution was 26.0% under the age of 18, 22.1% from 18 to 24, 27.1% from 25 to 44, 15.5% from 45 to 64, and 9.4% who were 65 years of age or older. The median age was 26 years. For every 100 females, there were 82.9 males. For every 100 females age 18 and over, there were 83.3 males.

The median household income was $25,108, and the median family income was $29,120. Males had a median income of $25,938 versus $15,799 for females. The per capita income for the CDP was $12,815. About 17.4% of families and 25.0% of the population were below the poverty line, including 33.0% of those under age 18 and 27.3% of those age 65 or over.

References

Census-designated places in Louisiana
Census-designated places in Tangipahoa Parish, Louisiana